The Museum of Transport, Greater Manchester aims to preserve and promote the public transport heritage of Greater Manchester in North West England. It is located in the Cheetham Hill area of Manchester.

Background
The museum was established in 1977 at Boyle Street, Cheetham Hill. It opened to the public on 27 May 1979. The day-to-day running of the museum is carried out by volunteers.

The museum is housed in a former Manchester Corporation Transport bus depot, to the rear of a former electric tram shed on Queens Road, built in 1901. The museum building itself was added later and consists of two distinct halves, a dedicated bus garage completed in 1928, which now serves as the museum entrance area and upper hall, and a lower hall which was created in 1935 by constructing a roof over the open space between the tram shed and the 1928 bus depot. The former tram shed is still in use today as a bus depot, occupied by Go North West. The whole block of buildings was Grade II listed in 1988 for its historical significance.

The museum became a Registered Charity in 1980, and a Registered Museum in May 2003.

Collection

The museum holds a sizeable collection, including around 80 buses, one of the largest collections of its kind in the United Kingdom. Due to the size of the building, some vehicles have to be kept off-site, with exhibits changed around every so often. In addition, vehicles often attend events around the country in the summer months. The museum collection is constantly developing and restoration work can often be seen by visitors, of which 70 or so are kept on the site. Also in the collection are two trolleybuses from Manchester and Ashton-under-Lyne corporations, and the prototype body Manchester Metrolink tram.

In addition to vehicle exhibits, the collection of objects includes old transport signs, uniforms, vehicle fittings, ticketing equipment, and several items used by Warner Bros. during the filming of Harry Potter and the Prisoner of Azkaban.

The extensive archive collection is available for research purposes by appointment and includes historic timetables, maps, books, posters, manuals and plans. The museum also holds a photographic archive collection, much of which is available online via the GMTS account on Flickr.com.

Events
The museum holds a number of regular events throughout the year.

March: Spring Transport Festival - Market day for specialist retailers and booksellers.
May: Themed event.
September: Trans-Lancs transport Show - held at Heaton Park, north Manchester. The event is staged on the first Sunday in September.
October: Themed event.
December: The Christmas Cracker - Market day for specialist retailers and booksellers.

For most of these events, a heritage bus service from Manchester Victoria station to the museum runs every 20 minutes between 09:50 and 17:00.

Location
The museum is approximately two miles north of Manchester city centre, close to the junction of the A665 (Cheetham Hill Road) and A6010 (Queens Road). It is at the north end of Boyle Street, adjoining the Go North West bus garage. The Queens Road tram stop on the Manchester Metrolink is 200m away. Bus services 41, 135 and 151 stop nearby. The museum is signposted from the Manchester Fort shopping centre.

The museum is open from 10 a.m. to 4.30 p.m. on Wednesdays, Saturdays, Sundays and Public Holidays (except at Christmas and New Year), and every day in August.

See also

Science and Industry Museum
List of museums in Greater Manchester
List of transport museums
Listed buildings in Manchester-M8

References

External links

Official Website

Bus museums in England
Grade II listed buildings in Manchester
Museums established in 1977
Museums in Manchester
Tourist attractions in Manchester
1977 establishments in England
History of transport in Greater Manchester